The Israel Football League (IFL), also known as the Kraft Family Israel Football League for sponsorship reasons with the Kraft Family, is an amateur American football league consisting of eight teams. The IFL is the highest level of American football in Israel and each season culminates in the Israel Bowl. The Ramat HaSharon Hammersare the reigning Israel Bowl champions, having defeated the Tel Aviv Pioneers in Israel Bowl XV after an undefeated season, for their first championship.

History

Background 
The original incarnation of the IFL consisted of pick-up games without helmets, pads or referees and was founded in 1999 by a group of football enthusiasts, including Ofri Becker, Gadi Gadot, Ben Friedman, Raviv Faig, Itay Ashkenazi and Ori Shterenbach. This initiative led to the formation of a tackle football  league that was first played in 2005-2006 and included three teams, the Tel Aviv Pioneers, Haifa Underdogs and Tel Aviv-Jaffa Sabres with Haifa winning the first championship. American football was present in Israel dating back to 1988, when American expat Steve Leibowitz founded a touch football league. In the summer of 2006, after one season, the Israeli group and Leibowitz agreed to merge their leagues and founded the current incarnation of the IFL. However, it wasn't until 2007 that the first official season took place with coaches, referees and full equipment under the governing body of American Football in Israel (AFI). The inaugural season consisted of four teams with the addition of the Jerusalem Lions, and concluded with the latter winning Israel Bowl I.

In 2008, New England Patriots owner Robert Kraft and his family began to sponsor the IFL and donated Kraft Family Stadium in Jerusalem to the league. 

Until 2017, there were no American football fields in Israel and, other than Kraft Family Stadium, which was only 80-yards long and narrower than an American football college field, the teams had to reserve soccer fields which weren't always available. That changed when the Kraft Family Sports Campus opened in Jerusalem in June 2017, thanks to the generosity of philanthropist and New England Patriots owner Mr. Robert Kraft and the Kraft Family. The Kraft Family Sports Campus includes multiple sports fields, including Israel's first regulation size American football field which now serves as the site for the Israel Bowl, as well as homefield for the Israeli National Team and the Jerusalem Lions.

2007–2008 season 
The inaugural season of the IFL, with regulation pads and staff, consisted of four teams: the Jerusalem Lions, the Haifa Underdogs, the HaSharon Pioneers, and the Tel Aviv-Jaffa Sabres. In the championship game, Israel Bowl I, the Jerusalem Lions defeated the Haifa Underdogs in overtime. 
MVP: Moshe Horowitz, Jerusalem Lions 

MIP: Erez Kaminski, Haifa Underdogs

2008–2009 season 
The IFL grew to five teams with the addition of another team in Jerusalem (Jerusalem Kings), while the Pioneers moved to Modi'in. The Pioneers defeated the defending champion Lions, 32–26, in double overtime in Israel Bowl II.
MVP: Asaf Katz, Modiin Pioneers

2009–2010 season 

The IFL expanded to seven teams with the addition of two expansion teams: the Be'er Sheva Black Swarm and the Judean Rebels. The schedule grew as well, as each team played ten regular season games with the top six teams qualifying for the playoffs. The Tel Aviv-Jaffa Sabres defeated the Jerusalem Lions in Israel Bowl III.

MVP: Jon Rubin, Jerusalem Kings

2010–2011 season 

The IFL expanded to eight teams with the expansion Herzliya Hammers joining the league. The Pioneers relocated to Tel Aviv. The league split into two divisions; the North Division with the Tel Aviv-Jaffa Sabres, Tel Aviv Pioneers, Haifa Underdogs and Herzliya Hammers; and the South Division, with the Jerusalem Lions, Jerusalem Kings, Judean Rebels and the Be'er Sheva Black Swarm. 

The Sabres won the North Division and clinched a first round bye in the playoffs and then defeated the Pioneers in the semifinals, who had defeated the Hammers in the first round. In the South Division, the Lions earned the first round bye. The Rebels defeated the Black Swarm in the first round and then upset the Lions in the semifinals by overcoming an 18-point deficit with 7:40 left in the game. The Rebels then held off a comeback attempt and defeated the Sabres in Israel Bowl IV, 32–30. 

MVP: Alex Swieca, Judean Rebels

2011–2012 season 

The IFL expanded to ten teams with the expansion Petah Tikva Troopers joining the South Division and the Northern Stars joining the North Division. In the playoffs, the 5th-seeded Haifa Underdogs routed the defending champion Judean Rebels in the first round but were defeated by the Tel Aviv-Jaffa Sabres in the semifinals. The Tel Aviv Pioneers defeated the Jerusalem Kings in the first round, and then routed the previously undefeated Jerusalem Lions behind a record-setting performance by running back Ilan Bielas.

Israel Bowl V featured both Tel Aviv teams. The Sabres took a 14–0 lead in the first quarter, but had no answer to Pioneers RB Ilan Bielas, who lead his team to a 28–22 lead in the second quarter. The teams were tied at halftime and the third quarter was a scoreless affair, which set the table for a back-and-forth fourth quarter. After exchanging multiple scores, the Pioneers were driving with one minute to go and the Sabres up by two. A miscommunication between QB Itay Ashkenazi and RB Koby Nimrod lead to a Pioneer fumble, which the Sabres recovered to clinch their second Israel Bowl title.

MVP: Chaim Schiff, Jerusalem Lions

2012–2013 season 

The IFL expanded to eleven teams with the expansion Rehovot Silverbacks joining the league. The division format was replaced with a simpler schedule where each team played the other once.  The first round saw two upsets, including the Kings' Hail Mary pass to defeat the Hammers. In the semifinals, the Sabres routed the Kings and the Rebels upset the Pioneers in over 100°F heat. The Sabres defeated the Rebels in Israel Bowl VI to secure their second straight Israel Bowl title and became the first team in IFL history to go undefeated through the regular season and postseason.

MVP: Dani Eastman, Judean Rebels

2013–2014 season 

Betzalel Friedman took over as commissioner of the IFL and the league expanded to play nine-on-nine instead of eight-on-eight. The IFL also implemented a foreign-player limit for the first time and the Hammers relocated to Ramat HaSharon. During a regular season game between the Tel Aviv-Jaffa Sabres and Judean Rebels, the Sabres walked off the field in protest of the refereeing. The team was handed a postseason ban and subsequently folded. 

The Rebels and Hammers earned the top two seeds for the playoffs, but both were upset in the semifinals; the Rebels lost to a strong Pioneer defense and the Hammers lost an overtime thriller to the Lions. Israel Bowl VII was the most lopsided IsraBowl ever, as the Pioneers routed the Lions, 80–28.

MVP: Dani Eastman, Judean Rebels

2014–2015 season 
The Silverbacks relocated five kilometers southeast to Mazkeret Batya. The Judean Rebels finished the regular season undefeated for the second consecutive season, behind the highest scoring offense and the second-best defense (in PPG) in IFL history. This time they were able to win the championship, defeating the Tel Aviv Pioneers, 20–10, in Israel Bowl VIII.

MVP: Dani Eastman, Judean Rebels

2015–2016 season 
The season consisted of a ten-game schedule and the league went to 80-yard fields. The Judean Rebels defeated the Tel Aviv Pioneers, 32–14, in Israel Bowl IX.

MVP: David Abell, Jerusalem Lions

2016–2017 season 
The tenth season of the IFL consisted of a ten-game schedule. The season concluded with the Jerusalem Lions erasing a ten-point deficit with 4 minutes left in the game, to defeat the Tel Aviv Pioneers in Israel Bowl X, as league and game MVP, David Abell, threw a walk-off touchdown in overtime to Ezzy Jaski.
For the Lions, it was a sweet second championship and first since Israel Bowl I, ending a drought during which they lost in the Israel Bowl three times (2,3 and 7).

MVP: David Abell, Jerusalem Lions

2017–2018 season 
Only seven teams competed this season, with the Ramat HaSharon Hammers going on hiatus. The season concluded with the Jerusalem Lions defeating the Petah Tikva Troopers, 28–20, in IsraBowl XI to win their second consecutive championship. David Abell was named Israel Bowl MVP for the second year in a row.

MVP: David Abell, Jerusalem Lions

2018–2019 season 
The season began on November 15, 2018 and was the first to feature eleven-man football and regulation-width fields. The Ramat HaSharon Hammers also returned to play after being on hiatus for a year. The Jerusalem Lions defeated the Petah Tikva Troopers, 29–26, in Israel Bowl XII to capture their third consecutive championship.

MVP: David Fitoussi, Jerusalem Lions

2019–2020 season 

The season began on November 28, 2019 and was scheduled to conclude on March 19, 2020 with IsraBowl XIII. However, after the regular season concluded the remaining games were postponed until further notice due to the COVID-19 pandemic and later cancelled.

MVP: Ronnie Hayes, Beersheva Black Swarm

2021 season 

The season began on April 29, 2021 and concluded on July 15, 2021 with Israbowl XIV. The Tel Aviv pioneers defeated the Jerusalem Lions 13-8.

2022 season 

The season began on February 3 2022. The season will only feature 7 teams due to the Be'er Sheva Black Swarm taking a hiatus.

Teams

Current Teams

Defunct Teams

Israel Bowl 
The Israel Bowl, sometimes referred to as the IsraBowl, is the Kraft Family IFL championship game. The Jerusalem Lions have won a record four Israel Bowl championships with a record seven Israel Bowl appearances. The first six champion teams were awarded the Becker Trophy.

Results

See also
 American football in Israel
 Israel national American football team

References

External links
Israel Football League
American Football in Israel
European Federation of American Football
International Federation of American Football

American football in Israel
Israel
American football
Sports leagues established in 2005
2005 establishments in Israel